Kohautia amatymbica, or tremble tops, is a species of flowering plant in the family Rubiaceae, native to southern Africa. Its roots are edible.

References

amatymbica
Flora of Mozambique
Flora of Zimbabwe
Flora of Swaziland
Flora of Lesotho
Flora of South Africa
Plants described in 1837